is a Japanese actor working for Watanabe Entertainment.

Biography and career
In 2017, Tsuna participated in the Junon Superboy Grand Prix and won.

In March 2018, he signed with the talent agency Watanabe Entertainment and debuted in the drama series Bungaku Shojo.

In January 2019, he joined the cast of Kishiryu Sentai Ryusoulger.

Tsuna is an engineering student at Nihon University.

Filmography

TV series

Film

References

External links
Official profile
Twitter

1998 births
Living people
People from Funabashi
Nihon University alumni
Japanese male television actors